= Addison Whitney =

US-based global branding firm

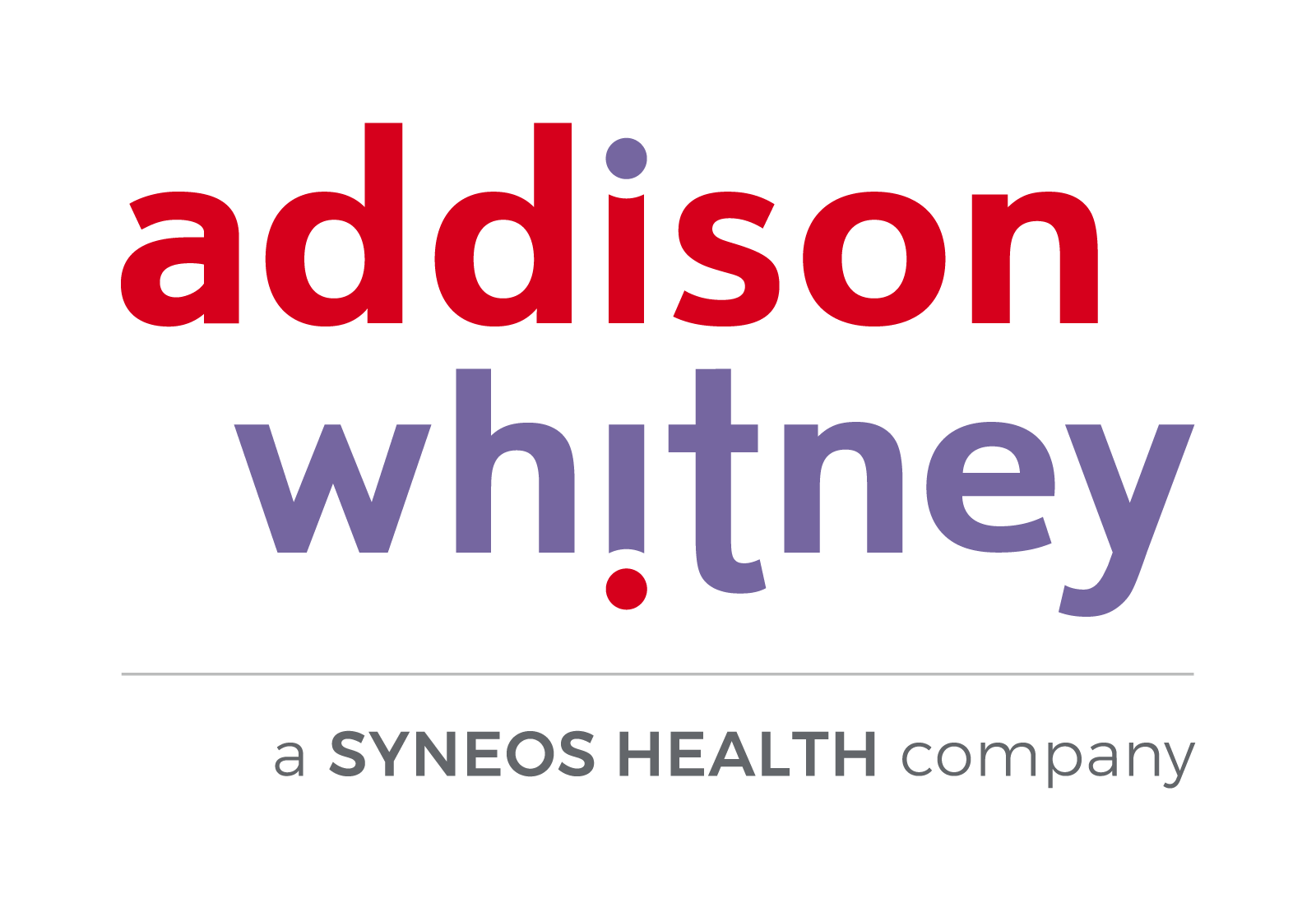
- Industry: Branding
- Founded: May 20, 1991 in Charlotte, North Carolina
- Headquarters: Charlotte, North Carolina, United States
- Number of locations: 7 offices (2014)
- Area served: Worldwide
- Services: Verbal Branding; Visual Branding; Brand Strategy; Market Research
- Parent: Syneos Health
- Website: addisonwhitney.com

Addison Whitney is a global branding firm headquartered in Charlotte, North Carolina. Founded in 1991, Addison Whitney has additional offices in New York City, Seattle, London, Tokyo and Munich. The company specializes in four core offerings, including Verbal Branding, Visual Branding, Brand Strategy, and Market Research, and serves clients across the healthcare, technology, consumer, financial, hospitality and business-to-business industries.

Addison Whitney created product names such as "Outlook" for Microsoft, "Kissables" for Hershey and "Escalade" for Cadillac.

== History ==
Addison Whitney was founded on May 20, 1991, as a global branding firm focused on brand name development. The firm was acquired by Interpublic in 1995. In 1998 Addison Whitney's management team decided to take the firm private. On June 1, 2007, inVentiv Health acquired Addison Whitney as part of their communications division.

In 2010, Addison Whitney Health was founded, focusing on healthcare and pharmaceutical clients.

== Offices ==
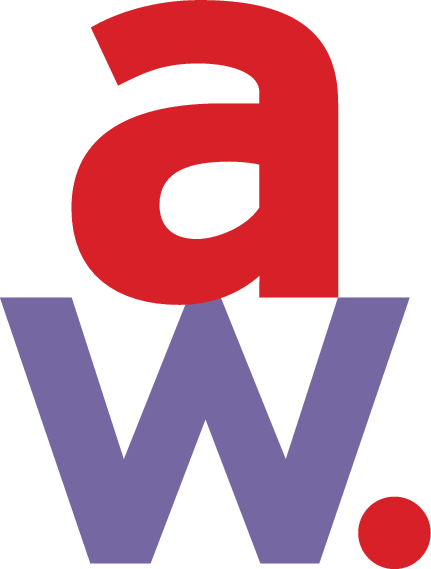

Addison Whitney currently has seven offices. In the United States, its global headquarters are in Charlotte, North Carolina, with offices in Seattle, Washington and New York City. Addison Whitney's European offices are located in London and Munich, with its Japanese operations based in Tokyo.

== AW Helping Hands ==
In 2008, Addison Whitney founded "AW Helping Hands", a company-wide volunteer initiative. As part of the corporate social responsibility campaign the AW Helping Hands team encourages Addison Whitney employees to participate in community service projects.
